The 2015 Springfield Lasers season was the 20th season of the franchise in World TeamTennis (WTT).

The Lasers had 3 wins and 11 losses, the worst record in WTT in 2015, and failed to qualify for the playoffs.

Season recap

Trade for Isner and draft
At the WTT Draft on March 16, 2015, it was announced that the Lasers had acquired the top-ranked American player John Isner in a trade with the Boston Lobsters for undisclosed consideration which was presumably financial, since no other players or draft choices were moved in connection with the deal. As the trade was announced, Isner said, "I’m really looking forward to joining the Springfield Lasers. I know Springfield has first-class tennis fans and the Lasers have been extremely close to bringing home the King Trophy the past couple of seasons. I’m very hopeful to help put them over the top in 2015." In the roster portion of the draft, the Lasers protected Anna-Lena Grönefeld and Michael Russell and selected Andre Begemann and roster-exempt player Alison Riske.

Other player transactions
On May 12, 2015, the Lasers signed Shelby Rogers as a substitute player. Rogers was a member of the 2014 WTT Champion Washington Kastles.

On July 10, 2015, the Lasers announced that Rogers would miss the 2015 season due to an injury. In her place, the Lasers signed Varvara Lepchenko and Sachia Vickery as substitute players.

A season of struggles
Things didn't go well for the Lasers from the start of the season. They lost their first four matches with three of those losses coming at home. They finally broke through with a win in front of the home fans on July 17, against the San Diego Aviators. Anna-Lena Grönefeld and Sachia Vickery earned a key 5–1 set win in women's doubles to help the cause. Grönefeld teamed with Andre Begemann in mixed doubles to win the final set in a tiebreaker and close out the victory.

On the evening following their first victory, the Lasers visited the Austin Aces, who entered the match with 4 wins and 0 losses. Grönefeld and Vickery continued their solid play by taking the opening set of women's doubles, 5–2. Vickery followed with a 5–1 set win in women's singles, and the Lasers had a 10–3 lead after two sets. But the Aces turns things around from there. They won the next two sets to cut the Lasers' lead to 16–13 heading to the final set. Teymuraz Gabashvili overpowered Michael Russell in the final set of men's singles, 5–2, to tie the match at 18 and send it to a super tiebreaker. Gabashvili dominated the super tiebreaker, 7–1, as the Aces dealt the Lasers a heartbreaking 19–18 defeat.

After the loss, the Lasers visited the Philadelphia Freedoms the next evening. The Freedoms won the first two sets to take a 10–6 lead. Russell and Begemann won the men's doubles set, 5–3, to cut the lead to 13–11. The Freedoms won the women's doubles set in a tiebreaker and took an 18–15 lead to the final set. In the men's singles, Russell redeemed himself after letting the previous match get away. He earned a 5–1 set win over Robby Ginepri that won the match for the Lasers in stunning fashion, 20–19.

After losing their next two matches, the Lasers hosted the Freedoms on July 24. It was marquee player John Isner who made the difference for the Lasers. He teamed with Begemann for a 5–2 set win in men's doubles that gave the Lasers a 14–11 lead after three sets. The Freedoms took the fourth set of women's doubles, 5–2, to tie the match at 16. In the final set, Isner beat Ginepri, 5–2, to give the Lasers a 21–18 victory that improved their record to 3 wins and 7 losses.

The following evening, the Lasers were eliminated from WTT playoff contention when the California Dream defeated the Boston Lobsters, 21–19, in extended play, a match which ended during the Lasers' 25–17 home loss to the Aviators.

The loss to the Aviators was the first of four consecutive losses by the Lasers to close the season.

Event chronology
 March 16, 2015: The Lasers acquired John Isner in a trade with the Boston Lobsters for undisclosed consideration.
 March 16, 2015: The Lasers protected Anna-Lena Grönefeld and Michael Russell and selected Andre Begemann and roster-exempt player Alison Riske in the WTT Draft.
 May 12, 2015: The Lasers signed Shelby Rogers as a substitute player.
 July 10, 2015: The Lasers signed Varvara Lepchenko and Sachia Vickery as substitute players.
 July 25, 2015: With a record of 3 wins and 7 losses, the Lasers were eliminated from WTT playoff contention when the California Dream defeated the Boston Lobsters, 21–19, in extended play.

Draft picks
Since the Lasers were the Western Conference champions in 2014, they selected next to last (sixth) in each round of the draft. Unlike previous seasons in which WTT conducted its Marquee Player Draft and its Roster Player Draft on different dates about one month apart, the league conducted a single draft at the Indian Wells Tennis Garden in Indian Wells, California on March 16, 2015. The selections made by the Lasers are shown in the table below.

Notes:

Match log
{| align="center" border="1" cellpadding="2" cellspacing="1" style="border:1px solid #aaa"
|-
! colspan="2" style="background:#3d1e56; color:#25d0ff" | Legend
|-
! bgcolor="ccffcc" | Lasers Win
! bgcolor="ffbbbb" | Lasers Loss
|-
! colspan="2" | Home team in CAPS
|}

Team personnel
References:

On-court personnel
  John-Laffnie de Jager – Head Coach
  Andre Begemann
  Anna-Lena Grönefeld
  John Isner
  Varvara Lepchenko
  Alison Riske
  Shelby Rogers (injured, did not play)
  Michael Russell
  Sachia Vickery

Front office
 Springfield-Greene County Park Board (represented by John Cooper) – Owner
 Bob Belote – Director
 Paul Nahon – General Manager

Notes:

Statistics
Players are listed in order of their game-winning percentage provided they played in at least 40% of the Lasers' games in that event, which is the WTT minimum for qualification for league leaders in individual statistical categories.

Men's singles

Women's singles

Men's doubles

Women's doubles

Mixed doubles

Team totals

Transactions
 March 16, 2015: The Lasers acquired John Isner in a trade with the Boston Lobsters for undisclosed consideration.
 March 16, 2015: The Lasers protected Anna-Lena Grönefeld and Michael Russell and selected Andre Begemann and roster-exempt player Alison Riske in the WTT Draft.
 March 16, 2015: The Lasers left James Blake, Līga Dekmeijere, Olga Govortsova, Ross Hutchins, Alisa Kleybanova, Raquel Kops-Jones, Jean-Julien Rojer and Abigail Spears unprotected in the WTT Draft effectively making them all free agents. Blake later signed with the San Diego Aviators as a wildcard player. Spears later signed with the Philadelphia Freedoms as a substitute player.
 May 12, 2015: The Lasers signed Shelby Rogers as a substitute player.
 July 10, 2015: The Lasers signed Varvara Lepchenko and Sachia Vickery as substitute players.

See also

References

External links
Springfield Lasers official website
World TeamTennis official website

Springfield Lasers season
Springfield Lasers 2015
Springfield Lasers